Strath Haven High School (also abbreviated as SHHS) is a four-year public high school in Wallingford, Delaware County, Pennsylvania, enrolling about 1,200 students.  SHHS is the only high school in the Wallingford-Swarthmore School District.  The school exhibits particular excellence in its special education program, connections to a local college and technical schools, and strong music and football programs.  As of 2020, the current principal is Greg Hilden.

History
Strath Haven High School is the product of a 1983 merger between the former Swarthmore High School and Nether Providence High School.  In 1971, Pennsylvania state officials had determined that Wallingford and Nether Providence school districts had too small enrollments to maintain an independent existence.  By 1980, enrollment in Swarthmore High school had dropped to the point that maintaining separate middle and high schools was no longer feasible.  Because it had smaller enrollment, the district closed Swarthmore High over bitter and acrimonious public protest.  (Many parents, opposed to the decision, attempted to form a private high school on the former Swarthmore campus.)  To mollify those opposed, the district officially closed Nether Providence High School as well, and created an entirely new school on the former Nether Providence campus, named after Strath Haven manor on the Thomas Leiper Estate.    

In 2005, the School District of Philadelphia selected then-principal Albert Bichner as Superintendent of High Schools.  In response, the school promoted assistant principal Mary Jo Yannacone, who remained principal until June 2018, when she became Assistant Superintendent for Springfield School District.  The school was then temporarily led by Andrea LaPira until the selection of Greg Hilden in 2020.

Overview 
The typical graduating class is approximately 300 persons.  

Former principal Al Bichner organized Strath Haven along the theme of the "Five A's," meaning academics, arts, athletics, altruism, and activities. An oft-cited "Five A's" figure is that around 80% of Strath Haven High School students participate in athletics, music, the arts, and a host of extracurricular clubs.

All students are required to complete four years of study in major subject areas, but also have limited freedom to select "elective" classes.  Strath Haven provides guidance counselors to assist in course selection and college and career planning.

A full-time psychologist and communications specialist are the core of a Student Assistance Program providing help to students at risk.

Football
The school competes in the twelve-team PIAA Central League, winning 10 times between 1996 and 2010. Between 1983 and 2022, the Strath Haven football team achieved an overall record of 280–145. The football team performed especially well in 1999 and 2000.  The team won state championships in those years, led by Mark Jones, a former punt returner for the Tennessee Titans, and Dan Connor, an All-American linebacker for Penn State who went on to be drafted by the Carolina Panthers and spent six seasons in the NFL.

Marching band 
Under previous director Jack Hontz, Strath Haven's marching band grew to become the largest band in Pennsylvania and the second largest in the nation.  In an average year, the band enrolled about 400 members, or one out of every three students.  Since Hontz's death, Strath Haven's marching band has been directed by Nicholas Pignataro.

Literary magazine 
Strath Haven High School publishes Jabberwocky, a student-produced literary magazine. The magazine, which is published once a year, includes artwork, poems, short stories, drawings and photographs.

Nontraditional education 
Special education programs are available for students with special needs. Strath Haven High School is known in the area for its high-quality assistance for hearing-impaired and students with disabilities.

The high school has a limited affiliation with Swarthmore College.  Exceptional students at the high school can — with the permission of Swarthmore professors — attend classes at the college for high school credit.  

Similar partnerships with Delaware County-area technical schools also allow students to train in electrical wiring, machining, auto repair, and other similar vocational skills.  Students enrolled in technical school programs spend one-half day at Strath Haven taking a required core curriculum, and one-half day at the technical high school.

College preparation / Measured performance 
The school is accredited by the Middle States Association and was awarded the National Blue Ribbon School of Excellence by the Department of Education in 1985 and 2002.  

Strath Haven students typically perform well on standardized tests and other measures of secondary school achievement.  Typically, about 15 students (5%) are National Merit Scholars; the Strath Haven mean SAT score exceeds the national mean by approximately 80-100 points in each category.  Likewise, mean ACT scores exceed the national mean by 5-9 points per category.

Other
On April 2, 2008, Barack Obama held a town hall meeting and Question and Answer session in the Strath Haven High School gymnasium. Later, on November 2, 2008, Senator John McCain held a "Road to Victory Rally" in the school's gymnasium. Senator McCain gave a speech, as did Senator Joe Lieberman, and Former Pennsylvania Governor Tom Ridge.

Notable alumni

Jacob Hoyle (born 1994), Olympic fencer
Dan Connor (born 1985), former NFL player 
Mark Jones (born 1980), former NFL player

References

External links 
Official site

Public high schools in Pennsylvania
Educational institutions established in 1984
Schools in Delaware County, Pennsylvania
1984 establishments in Pennsylvania